St Ninian's High School is a six-year co-educational Roman Catholic state high school in Giffnock, East Renfrewshire, Scotland. The school, which opened in 1984, serves Giffnock, Clarkston, Thornliebank, Newton Mearns, Eaglesham, Netherlee, Waterfoot, Netherplace, Millhall and Busby in East Renfrewshire. The school roll was 1,714 as of September 2005, and the Head Teacher is Gerry O’Neil. The school's motto is "Floreat Iuventus" which translates as "Let youth Flourish".

Overview 

The school is often used as a 'test bed' for new systems or initiatives (due to its relative affluence and high exam pass rates). Examples include:
First public-sector organisation to win the 'Quality Scotland' business excellence award;
First state-funded school in Scotland to abandon the Standard Grade examination system in favour of the Higher Still system, using Access 3, Intermediate 1 and Intermediate 2 for pupils in third and fourth year, while maintaining "Highers" in fifth year  and Advanced Highers in S6.

History
Between 2000 and 2002, a multi-million pound extension was built for the school (which was originally designed to hold only 700 pupils). The extension had been scheduled for years earlier (and completion by 1999 at the latest) however problems with the PFI tender for another local school project caused years of delay.
2009 saw the completion of another extension, housing ten science classrooms, as well as geography and modern language classrooms.

On 11 March 2008, the school was given the best report ever given to a Scottish Secondary school, gaining seven "excellents" and 10 "very goods".

Notable alumni

 Kenny Boyle, actor, playwright, and author 
 Andrew Robertson, footballer currently playing for Premier League club Liverpool and captain of the Scotland national team
 John Spencer, retired footballer who played for Chelsea, Rangers and Motherwell
 James McArdle, actor
 Aiden McGeady, footballer currently playing for Hibernian and the Republic of Ireland
 Calum Gallagher, footballer currently playing for Dumbarton
 Liam Lindsay, footballer currently playing for Barnsley
 Lewis Smith, footballer currently playing for Hamilton Academical

References

External links
St Ninian's High School's page on Scottish Schools Online

Catholic secondary schools in East Renfrewshire
Educational institutions established in 1984
1984 establishments in Scotland
Giffnock